The National Guard of Kyrgyzstan (Kyrgyz: Кыpгыз Pecпyбликacынын Улуттук гвардия; Russian: Национальная гвардия Кирги́зская Респу́блика) is the National Guard of the Armed Forces of the Republic of Kyrgyzstan. The national guard was founded on December 6, 1991 by order of President Askar Akayev. The troops took their first oath July 20, 1992. It carries out functions of a representative and protocol nature, protection and protection of strategic facilities of the country, liquidation of the consequences of natural disasters and emergency situations. In 2014, the Internal Troops of the Ministry of the Interior were absorbed into the National Guard as a result of military reforms in the country. This arrangement would stay until September 2018 when the two were separated and the Internal Troops were reformed. In 2016, the Commander of the National Guard was put onto the General Staff of the Armed Forces.

Functions 
The following tasks are assigned to the National Guard:

 Protection of the constitutional system and state sovereignty of the country
 Implementation of measures in the conditions of the military and emergency states
 Participation in the territorial defense of the Kyrgyz Republic
 Protection of state and strategic facilities
 Interact with state bodies in charge of national security on issues related to public security  
 Implement measures of alertness
 Eliminate of illegal armed groups 
 Manage the consequences of natural and man-made emergencies
 Work as an anti-terrorism force
 Perform ceremonial rituals at protocol events
 Ensure the protection of information constituting state secrets

Composition 
 Headquarters Command
 Leadership Staff
 Commander of the National Guard
 First Deputy Commander of the National Guard
 Deputy Commander of the National Guard
 Deputy Commander of the National Guard
 Bars Commandant Brigade
 Edelweiss Training Center
 Panther Special Forces Brigade
 Rapid Reaction Battalion (at Manas Airbase)
 Honor Guard Battalion (Military Unit No. 701)
 1st company (subordinated to the President)
 2nd company
 3rd company
 Band of the National Guard (Улуттук гвардиянын оркестри)
 Medical Division

Honor Guard Company 
The guard of honor is formed from the 701st Military Unit of the National Guard. It take part in state visits and the presidential inaugural parade of the National Guard. The soldiers of the guard of honor of the National Guard stand at attention at the National Flagpole on Ala-Too Square in Bishkek, performing a changing of the guard ceremony every hour since August 16, 1998. It also represented the Kyrgyz Republic at foreign military parades, particularly the 2015 Moscow and Beijing Victory Day Parade. The unit is similar in structure and organization to Russia's 154th Preobrazhensky Independent Commandant's Regiment and Kazakhstan's Aibyn Regiment. In November 2015, the unit received its first unit banner from General Janybek Kaparov. The current commander of the company is the Captain Maksat Rahimdinov.

Panther Airborne Brigade 
The Panther Airborne Brigade (also known as Military Unit 714) was founded in April 1992. It is designed to serve during hostilities. This may include the destruction of gangs, the localization of terrorist groups, and the elimination of natural disasters. It took part in the Batken Conflict of 1999 in southern Kyrgyzstan during which it rebuffed the Islamic Movement of Uzbekistan from the country.

Operational Battalion 
On 20 July 2015, President Almazbek Atambayev presented the battle banner to a separate operational battalion.

Recruitment and training 
National Guard personnel are composed of soldiers and civilians alike. The basis for recruitment is laid out under a voluntary contract, as well as conscription of citizens for military service. The selection of servicemen to the National Guard is carried out in coordination with the Ministry of Defence and the Ministry of the Interior. While the National Guard does not provide its own independent educational course, many National Guard personnel are educated in higher military institutions (such as the Armed Forces Military Institute) and foreign institutions (mostly academies in Russia and Kazakhstan). As of recently, new recruits take their oath of allegiance in a ceremony on Victory Square, Bishkek.

Uniform 

In 2015, a new version of the general uniform was presented to the National Guard. The official color of the National Guard is dark turquoise, which is reflected in its uniform. The summer uniform is a dark turquoise tunic worn over a buttoned shirt and tie, which are worn alongside trousers of the same color, as well as boots, white gloves, and a hat. On the other hand, the winter uniform consists of a grey overcoat that is worn over the regular uniform while a traditional Russian Ushanka hat is worn.

Professional holiday 
July 20 marks the Day of the National Guard is the official professional holiday for the National Guard. The holiday coincides with the founding of the National Guard by President Akayev on this date in 1992.

List of leaders 

 Abdygul Chotbaev (1992 – August 24, 2005)
 Sultan Kurmanov (September 2005 – May 25, 2006)
 Asanbek Alymkozhoev (May 25, 2006 – 2009)
 Asanbek Alymkozhoev (July 24, 2013 – February 6, 2014)
 Melis Satybaldiev (February 22, 2014 – May 12, 2016)
 Melis Satybaldiev (May 12, 2016 - June 16, 2016)
 Mirbek Kasymkulov (June 16, 2016 – February 11, 2017)
 Almazbek Karasartov (February 11, 2017 – January 19, 2019)
 Talantbek Ergeshov (January 19, 2019 – Present)

The Commander of the National Guard is the de facto head of the national guard and the highest-ranking officer in the branch. Moreover, he/she is a member of the General Staff and reports directly to its chief.

Gallery

See also 
 Azerbaijani National Guard
 Republican Guard (Kazakhstan)
 154th Preobrazhensky Independent Commandant's Regiment
 Independent Honor Guard Battalion of the Ministry of Defence of Turkmenistan
 Presidential National Guard

Videos 
Портретник: Командир военной части №701 Мирлан Темиров
A member of the National Guard Band
Показательные выступления Национальной Гвардии 23.07.2012
Ата Мекен коргоочулар күнүнө арналат
Улуттук гвардиянын оркестри "Марш Будапешт"/Санат ТВ
Таңкы беш: Улуттук гвардиянын оркестри

References 

Military units and formations of Kyrgyzstan
1991 establishments in Kyrgyzstan
Military units and formations established in 1991